Kompsoscypha is a genus of fungi in the family Sarcoscyphaceae. There are four species in the genus, which have a widespread distribution in tropical regions.

References

External links
Kompsoscypha at Index Fungorum

Sarcoscyphaceae
Pezizales genera